Kreis Koschmin was a district in Regierungsbezirk Posen, in the Prussian Province of Posen from 1887 to 1919. Today, the territory of this district lies in the southern part of the Greater Poland Voivodeship in Poland.

History 
On October 1, 1887, the Koschmin district was formed from the northern part of the Krotoschin district. The town of Koschmin was the district capital.

On December 27, 1918, the Greater Poland uprising began in the province of Posen, and by January 2, 1919, the town of Koschmin was under Polish control. On February 16, 1919, an armistice ended the Polish-German fighting. With the signing of the Treaty of Versailles on June 28, 1919, the German government officially ceded the Koschmin district to the newly founded Second Polish Republic.

Demographics 
According to the Prussian census of 1910, Kreis Koschmin had a population of 33,519, of which 83% were Poles and 17% were Germans.

Military command 
Kreis Koschmin was part of the military command in Posen at Kosten.

Court system 
The main court was in Lissa, with lower courts in Koschmin and Krotoschin.

Civil registry offices 
In 1905, these civil registry offices served the following towns in Kreis Koschmin:
Borek
Koschmin
Pogorzela
Starygrod
Wiesenfeld

Police districts
In 1905, these police districts served towns in Kreis Koschmin:
Borek
Koschmin
Pogorzela

Catholic churches 
In 1905, these Catholic parish churches served towns in Kreis Koschmin:
Baschlow
Groß Strzelce
Margarethendorf
Pogorzela
Walkow
Borek
Kobylin
Mokronos
Radenz
Wielowieś
Cerekwice
Koschmin
Pempowo
Starygrod
Wiesenfeld

Protestant churches 
In 1905, these Protestant parish churches served towns in Kreis Koschmin:
Borek
Kobylin
Krotoschin
Pogorzela
Dobrzyca
Koschmin
Königsfeld

Communities 
These records come from the 1905 Prussian gazetteer Gemeindelexikon für das Königreich Preußen.

External links 
 List of genealogical records

References 

Districts of the Province of Posen